Mao's Last Dancer is a Memoir written by Chinese-Australian author Li Cunxin and first published in 2003. It recounts his journey from a young, impoverished village boy destined to labor in the fields of China to a world-famous professional dancer.

Character list
Li Cunxin
The narrator of the memoir, who grew up in a destitute rural household in China, was selected by the Chinese Communist Party to become a ballet dancer trainee in Madame Mao's Beijing Dance Academy when he was eleven. Later, he got a chance to study abroad in America as an exchange student. After struggling hard, he finally decided not to go back to China, following his destiny of freedom instead.

Li Cunxin
Also known as his inner self. His inner self guides him throughout the book

Alfred Zhong

Elizabeth Mackey 
Li Cunxin's ex-wife. She met Li Cunxin in the summer at the Houston Ballet and started a secret relationship with him and later she married him when he decided not to go back to China. Although they got divorced eventually, she gave Li the opportunity to stay in America.

Niang
(see niáng on Wiktionary)
Li Cunxin's mother. She was a rural Chinese woman, as well as a loving mother. In Li's life, she was his impetus, driving him forward while he was in adverse circumstances. She was what gave Li the courage and strength to continue ballet. She was a very important part of Li's life.

Ben Stevenson
One of the leaders of the Houston Ballet Association, as well as Li Cunxin's American dancing guide and host family. He was very nice, and gave much helpful advice to Li.

Dia
Li Cunxin's father. He was a Chinese farmer who was characterized with honesty and tolerance.

Teacher Xiao
One of Li Cunxin's teachers. He is inspirational to Li Cunxin and has helped him face many of his challenges during his ballet career in Beijing.

Story line
Li Cunxin is born into a poor family commune in a small rural village in Shandong Province, where he is destined to work in the fields as a labourer.  At first overlooked but selected after a suggestion by his teacher during a school visit, Li seems bewildered by the gruff preliminary inspection screening at the provincial capital city of Qingdao.  Selected to travel to Beijing to audition for a place in Madame Mao's Dance Academy, he is admitted to its ballet school after passing a series of physical tests.

Seven years of arduous training follow. He struggles at the academy, failing to excel as he tries to cope with his homesickness. There is no freedom within the rigid schedule, where he must balance hours and hours of dance classes along with strenuous academic classes. He also campaigns to be part of the Communist youth party, surviving rigorous interviews; after he is let in, an additional portion of his time is given to meetings. But Cunxin doesn't mind; he has a calling now: serving glorious Communism. The arrival of a new teacher, this one less likely to shout, changes his grim outlook on dance. He puts more emphasis on having fun and on knowing strengths and weaknesses. Teacher Xiao keeps an eye on Cunxin, spotting something other teachers hadn't yet seen. The teacher also (dangerously) differs from others at the academy because of his devotion to classical ballet, considered too Western to be taught at the school (as opposed to the politically motivated, strident form favoured by Madame Mao). His determination and courage, paired with Teacher Xiao's advice and motivation allows him to be the top of the class, offered more and more roles. This leads to him being grudgingly permitted by the Academy to travel abroad to Ben Stevenson's Houston Ballet company as a visiting student for six weeks as the government has slightly slackened its censorship of Western culture due to upheavals in position.

In the United States, he begins to question the Chinese Communist Party dictates upon which he has been raised. America is not filled with filthy-looking capitalists, and the sheer wealth and size of the buildings and the people clearly indicate that China is the poverty stricken country, not America. However, he knows this sentiment is too dangerous to be spoken, and upon return to China, even though he loved every bit of America, he tones it down and recites some Communist propaganda for the report to be filed so he can return in two months time. However, despite the lies, the government refuses to let him return to the U.S. Three months later, he manages to get his visa and goes—this time for a full year dancing in the Houston Ballet. He starts a secret romance with aspiring American dancer, Elizabeth Mackey, keeping it a secret so his government doesn't find out and send him back. He is quickly promoted to soloist position and allowed five more months.  In the last month, Cunxin is reluctant to leave, so he and Elizabeth rush their marriage so that Cunxin can remain in the United States indefinitely, thus avoiding a defection which may have consequences for his family.  Visiting the Chinese Consulate to announce his decision while trying to prevent the sure backlash on Stevenson, the resident Chinese diplomat forcibly detains Li in attempt to coerce his return to China; when he continues to refuse to go willingly, the Party agrees to release and allow him to stay, but revokes his citizenship and declares he can never return to the land of his birth.  Full of concern for his family, Cunxin continues to dance, but his relationship with Elizabeth ends in divorce, and he cites his youth and cultural differences as the reason.

Cunxin is  quickly promoted to principal dancer status, making numerous premieres and winning awards, but severely injured his back, putting him out of commission for over two months. Despite the setback, he continues dancing, and soon after, the Chinese government allowed his parents to come to America to visit him after six years of being cut off from his family. They arrive to watch him in the Nutcracker, and sob as they reunite, and the audience gives a standing ovation. Li meets and marries Australian ballerina Mary McKendry, and they finally go back to his old village. Cunxin meets with his old Teacher Xiao, and performs for him and his parents, but feels an inexplicable amount of guilt for the huge difference in how he lives and how the rest of the village lives, but consoles himself in thinking that he has fulfilled all his mother ever wanted for him. They return to America and continue dancing.

Sophie, Cunxin and Mary's first child, is born profoundly deaf, to their devastation. Mary gives up her career to take care of her, and Sophie has led a normal life because of it, also taking dance classes in following in her parents footsteps. They go on to have two more children, perfectly healthy, but decide to move to Mary's home country, Australia. Their farewell performance, Romeo and Juliet, is broadcast live throughout China to five hundred million viewers. In Australia, he keeps dancing, but also gets a job managing one of the largest stock brokerage firms in Australia. He continues to visit his mother and his village, never forgetting where he came from.

References

External links
 Official site
 Biography at BookBrowse
 Interview at ballet.co.uk (2003)
 Transcript of ABC interview (2004)

Australian memoirs
2003 non-fiction books
Show business memoirs